Paul Gauci (fl. 1830s-1860s), was a lithographer of Maltese extraction, carrying on a business in London with his father, Maxim Gauci, and brother, William. The firm, located at 9 North Crescent, Bedford Square, was among the leading lithographers of the day, ranking with Charles Joseph Hullmandel and Vincent Brooks, Day & Son.

References

External links
 

English lithographers
English people of Maltese descent